Hamzabeyli is a village in Lalapaşa town of Edirne Province, Turkey and one of the three border crossing points between Turkey and Bulgaria is situated within here. This border crossing is the newest yet opened between Bulgaria and Turkey in 2006.

Hamzabeyli border crossing point was previously in use in Ottoman times. But closed after the fall of the empire. By the entry of Bulgaria into EU, the vehicle traffic between Turkey has increased significantly. Therefore, making the reopening of a new border crossing point necessary. Hamzabeyli crossing point is mainly aimed for commercial traffic (e.g. trucks) but non-commercial (e.g. automobile, motorcycle) traffic is also allowed. Hamzabeyli border crossing point features:

  500.000 vehicle and 1.500.000 passenger capacity, annually.
  64.000 m2 total open area.
 2.000 m2 commercial buildings area.
 1.800 m2 administrative buildings area.
 4+4 automobile and 4+4 truck platforms (16 in total).
 2 vehicle weight scales and 2 x-ray vehicle scanners.
 A duty-free shop, a bank, an insurance company and a restaurant.

Hamzabeyli border crossing has relatively less traffic than its neighbours, namely Kapıkule and Dereköy—despite its truck traffic. This is because it provides access to mid-Bulgaria where there are no major cities and connecting roads to neighbouring countries. Whereas Kapıkule is closer to Sofia and thus to Western Europe; Dereköy is closer to Burgas and Varna.

References

Villages in Lalapaşa District
Bulgaria–Turkey border crossings